Park Yun-Hwa (born 13 June 1978) is a South Korean football midfielder.

His previous club is FC Seoul, Gwangju Sangmu (military service), Daegu FC and Gyeongnam FC.

Club career statistics

External links

1986 births
Living people
Association football midfielders
South Korean footballers
FC Seoul players
Gimcheon Sangmu FC players
Daegu FC players
Pohang Steelers players
Gyeongnam FC players
K League 1 players
People from Wonju
Sportspeople from Gangwon Province, South Korea